The 2014 Tunis Open was a professional tennis tournament played on clay courts. It was the ninth edition of the tournament which was part of the 2014 ATP Challenger Tour. It took place in Tunis, Tunisia between 28 April and 4 May 2014.

Singles main-draw entrants

Seeds

Other entrants
The following players received wildcards into the singles main draw:
  Ameur Ben Hassen
  Danyal Sualehe
  Abid Mehdi
  Lamine Ouahab

The following players received entry from the qualifying draw:
  Gianluca Naso
  Juan Lizariturry
  Alessandro Giannessi
  Flavio Cipolla

Doubles main-draw entrants

Seeds

Other entrants
The following pairs received wildcards into the doubles main draw:
  Grégoire Burquier /  Florent Serra
  Juan Lizariturry /  Lamine Ouahab
  Mehdi Abid /  Ameur Ben Hassen

Champions

Singles

 Simone Bolelli def.  Julian Reister, 6–4, 6–2

Doubles

 Pierre-Hugues Herbert /  Adil Shamasdin def.  Stephan Fransen /  Jesse Huta Galung, 6–3, 7–6(7–5)

External links
Official Website

Tunis Open
Tunis Open